The Bugatti 18/3 Chiron is a 1999 concept car developed by French automobile manufacturer Bugatti Automobiles and designed by Fabrizio Giugiaro of Italdesign. Powered by a 6.3 L W18 engine, it is a 2-seater mid-engine coupé. The 18/3 Chiron was the last in a trio of Bugatti concept cars by Italdesign, after the 1998 EB 118 coupé and the 1999 EB 218 saloon.

The Chiron name was used again on the 2016 successor to the Bugatti Veyron.

Name origin
The 18/3 Chiron is named after Bugatti race driver Louis Chiron, while the "18/3" prefix stands for the engine's 18 cylinders distributed into three banks of six cylinders each.

Description
The Bugatti 18/3 Chiron premiered at the Frankfurt Motor Show in September 1999.

Design
Fabrizio Giugiaro of Italdesign was responsible for the design with input from Hartmut Warkuß from the Volkswagen design centre in Wolfsburg. In creating a logical successor to the EB110, they had the unique opportunity to style Bugatti's possible flagship model.

Airflow management and aerodynamics were key considerations in the exterior design. Below the traditional horseshoe radiator grille a large opening provides enough air to the radiators of the 6.3-litre engine; much of this air is extracted though vents located forward of the front wheel openings. A similar system is used on the side of the car to cool the rear brakes.
At the rear a diffuser was integrated in the rear bumper. A retractable rear wing deploys at high speeds, much like on the EB 110.
The 20-inch eight-spoke wheels resemble the cast aluminium wheels first found on Louis Chiron's Type 35B. The stylish body work was made from carbon fibre. Lighting on both ends of the car was cutting edge at its time, including triple Xenon headlights and elongated turn signals at the rear who also served as the tail lights of the car, two double exhaust pipes were visible through a large air extractor at the rear which also served as the underbody spoiler.
Inside, the cabin is upholstered in Blu Pacifico and Sabbia leather with aluminium accents as well as a removable watch on the passenger side.

Important design elements such as the classic horse shoe grille, inset front lights, converging front hood and an exposed intake plenum would eventually be integrated into the production Veyron EB 16.4.

Engine and chassis

In order to construct a fully working prototype, Bugatti utilised the chassis and four-wheel drive system sourced from the Lamborghini Diablo VT in the 18/3 Chiron.

The 18/3 Chiron uses the same Volkswagen-designed W18 engine that first appeared on the 1998 EB 118 and the 1999 EB 218 concept cars.
The 18/3 Chiron's W18 engine is composed of three banks of six cylinders with a sixty degree offset between each cylinder bank. In contrast, the W16 engine in Bugatti Automobile's first production car, the 2005 Veyron EB 16.4 features a four-bank configuration of four cylinders each, totalling sixteen cylinders.

Performance
But these numbers were never verified.

References

External links

Bugatti 18/3 Chiron on the Italdesign Giugiaro official website

18 3 Chiron
Italdesign concept vehicles
Rear mid-engine, all-wheel-drive vehicles
Cars introduced in 1999
Bugatti concept vehicles